Messina Springs was a small community, northwest of Messina (now East Syracuse), which was settled in the early 19th century around several mineral springs east of Syracuse, New York, United States, at the intersection of James Street and Thompson Road.  James Street was then a main east–west road from Syracuse to Messina and Manlius Center.  Thompson Road was a main north–south thoroughfare in eastern Onondaga County with the first bridge east of Syracuse to cross over the Erie Canal at Headson's Landing.

Reputed to have healing powers, these springs attracted a large clientele, culminating in the late 19th century with a spa, hotel, casino and race track located there. The mania for such restorative waters had waned by early in the 20th century and Messina Springs declined.  A fire consumed the hotel and casino around 1913. All that remains of this community is a tiny cemetery on James Street just west of Thomson Road.  Lists of persons buried at this cemetery are available at Ancestry.com and FindaGrave.com

References

Syracuse metropolitan area
Former populated places in Onondaga County, New York
DeWitt, New York